Three Ruthless Ones, Gunfight at High Noon or Sons of Vengeance is a 1964 Spanish/Italian western film directed by Joaquin L. Romero Marchent, produced by Alberto Grimaldi, scored by Riz Ortolani, and starring Richard Harrison, Raf Baldassare and Gloria Milland.

It was shot in Almería.

Cast

References

External links
 

Spanish Western (genre) films
Italian Western (genre) films
Spaghetti Western films
1964 Western (genre) films
1964 films
Films directed by Joaquín Luis Romero Marchent
Films with screenplays by Rafael Romero Marchent
Films scored by Riz Ortolani
Films shot in Almería
Films shot in Madrid
1960s Italian films